Astragalus oophorus is a species of milkvetch known by the common name egg milkvetch. It is native to the western United States, mainly California and Nevada, though one variety can be found as far east as Colorado. It is a plant of sagebrush and other dry habitat.

Description
The flowers are cream-colored or reddish purple with white tips.

Varieties
There are several varieties of Astragalus oophorus, including:
A. o. var. caulescens - native to the western US from Nevada to Colorado
A. o. var. clokeyanus - endemic to Nevada
A. o. var. lavinii (Lavin's milkvetch) - native to Nevada and known from California

External links

Jepson Manual Treatment - Astragalus oophorus
USDA Plants Profile: Astragalus oophorus
Photo gallery: Astragalus oophorus var. levinii

oocarpus
Flora of the Western United States
Flora of Nevada
Flora of the California desert regions
Flora of the Great Basin
Flora without expected TNC conservation status